The strength and vitality of the many neighbourhoods that make up Toronto, Ontario, Canada has earned the city its unofficial nickname of "the city of neighbourhoods." There are over 140 neighbourhoods officially recognized by the City of Toronto  and upwards of 240 official and unofficial neighbourhoods within city limits.

The current City of Toronto is the amalgamation of the former Metropolitan Toronto municipalities. These are East York, Etobicoke, North York, Scarborough, Toronto and York, each of which retains a community history. The names of these municipalities are still often used by Toronto residents, sometimes for disambiguation purposes as amalgamation resulted in duplicated street names. The area known as Toronto before the 1998 amalgamation is sometimes called the "old" City of Toronto, and "the core". For administrative purposes, Toronto is divided into four districts: Etobicoke-York, North York, Scarborough and Toronto-East York.

The former Toronto district is, by far, the most populous and densest part of the city. It is also the business and administrative centre of the city. The uniquely Torontonian bay-and-gable housing style is common throughout the former city. The "inner ring" suburbs of York and East York are older, predominantly middle-income areas, and ethnically diverse. Much of the housing stock in these areas consists of pre-World War II single-family houses and some post-war high-rises. Many of the neighbourhoods in these areas were built up as streetcar suburbs and contain many dense and mixed-use streets, some of which are one-way. They share many characteristics with sections of the "old" city outside the downtown core. The "outer ring" suburbs of Etobicoke, Scarborough, and North York are much more suburban in nature (although these districts are developing urban centres of their own, such as North York City Centre around Mel Lastman Square).

The following is a list of the more notable neighbourhoods, organized by former municipality.

Neighbourhoods by former municipality

Toronto

Old Toronto refers to the City of Toronto and its boundaries from 1967 to 1997. It is sometimes referred to as the "South" or "Central" district, and includes the "downtown core". Some of these names such as "The Fashion District" are (or were) used as marketing for the areas or by BIAs; this area is actually called "King-Spadina" by locals. Another example is the "Old Town of York", also known as "King and Parliament" (although that intersection is one block east of the original ten blocks that formed the old town). Some people in the area also consider it to be a suburb of the main city of Toronto, as many choose to move there in pursuit of a more relaxed and "backwoods" vibe.

Many were recreated or named to reconnect the areas with their past history, early beginnings, or even recent use and prominence. Some historical city "wards" used in the 19th century are no longer used: St. David's, St. John's, St. Paul's, St. George's, St. Andrew's, and St. Patrick's wards. There was a ward named for the patron saint of each of the three British nationalities: English (St. George), Scottish (St. Andrew), Welsh (St. David) and Irish (St. Patrick). ,  and  still survive as subway stations, though St. George station is not named after the ward, but after St. George Street instead, itself named after Quetton St. George, a local military officer and landowner. St. Lawrence's Ward (named after the patron saint of Canada and the river, itself also named after the saint) remains, known today as "St. Lawrence". St. Paul's (named after the saint) remains as the name of an electoral district for each of the three levels of government, although the electoral district has very little to no overlap with the historic St. Paul's Ward and beginning in the 2015 Canadian federal election, the electoral district was renamed Toronto—St. Paul's. This meant that the St. Paul's electoral district is a misnomer for much of the history of the electoral district.

For the purposes of geographic distinction, Old Toronto is broken down into four subsections:

Downtown Core (Central)

 Alexandra Park
 The Annex
 Baldwin Village
 Cabbagetown
 CityPlace
 Chinatown
 Church and Wellesley
 Corktown
 Discovery District
 Distillery District
 Entertainment District

 East Bayfront
 Fashion District
 Financial District
 Garden District
 Grange Park
 Harbord Village
 Harbourfront
 Kensington Market
 Little Japan (within the northern half of the former First Chinatown within what was once The Ward)
 Moss Park
 Old Town

 Quayside (future planned neighbourhood)
 Queen Street West
 Regent Park
 South Core
 St. James Town
 St. Lawrence
 Toronto Islands
 Trefann Court
 University (includes Huron–Sussex)
 Yorkville

East End

 The Beaches (also known as The Beach)
 East Chinatown
 East Danforth
 Gerrard Street East (Gerrard India Bazaar or Little India)
 Greektown (also known as The Danforth after the street it is on)
 Leslieville

 Main Square
 Playter Estates
 Port Lands
 Riverdale
 Upper Beaches
 Villiers Island (future planned neighbourhood on an artificial island at the mouths of the Don River in the Port Lands)

North End

 Bedford Park
 Casa Loma
 Chaplin Estates
 Davisville Village
 Deer Park (Yonge and St. Clair)
 Forest Hill (and Forest Hill Village and Upper Village)
 Lawrence Park
 Lytton Park
 Midtown
 Moore Park

 North Toronto
 Rosedale
 South Hill (includes Rathnelly)
 Summerhill
 Uptown
 Wanless Park
 Wychwood Park
 Yonge–Eglinton (considered centre of Midtown Toronto)

West End

 Beaconsfield Village
 Bloor West Village
 Bloorcourt Village
 Bracondale Hill
 Brockton Village
 Carleton Village
 Corso Italia
 Davenport
 Dovercourt Park
 Dufferin Grove
 Earlscourt

 Fort York
 High Park
 The Junction (formerly West Toronto; a short section on Dundas Street also contains Little Malta)
 Junction Triangle
 Koreatown
 Liberty Village
 Little Italy
 Little Portugal
 Little Tibet
 Mirvish Village

 Niagara
 Ordinance Triangle
 Palmerston
 Parkdale
 Queen Street West
 Regal Heights
 Roncesvalles
 Runnymede
 Seaton Village
 Swansea
 Trinity–Bellwoods
 Wallace Emerson

East York

An autonomous urban borough until 1997, East York is located north of Danforth Avenue between the Don River to the west and Victoria Park Avenue to the east. East York was an exclave of York from 1922 to 1924. East York developed contemporaneously with the West End of old Toronto, and it is similar in form and character. In 1967, East York was expanded to include the Town of Leaside. Since the 1998 amalgamation, it is administered together with old Toronto, and separate from Scarborough, North York, and Etobicoke-York, by the "Toronto and East York Neighbourhood Council".

East York itself is commonly divided into two zones with mainly Edwardian urban neighbourhoods situated south of Taylor-Massey Creek and referred to as Old East York.

Old East York
 Broadview North
 Crescent Town
 East Danforth
 Pape Village
 Woodbine Heights

Suburban East York
 Bermondsey
 Governor's Bridge
 Leaside
 O'Connor–Parkview
 Thorncliffe Park

Etobicoke

The former township and city of Etobicoke is on the west side of the Humber River. Several of its neighbourhoods, such as Long Branch, New Toronto, and Mimico, were villages independent of Etobicoke. Others, such as Claireville, Islington and Thistletown were former postal villages established when Etobicoke was an agrarian district. Others are residential subdivisions built after World War II as Toronto expanded.

Etobicoke is often divided into three zones: north, central, and south, roughly approximate to that of the electoral districts of all three levels of government.

 Alderwood
 Centennial Park
 Claireville
 Eatonville (Etobicoke West Mall)
 The Elms
 Eringate – Centennial – West Deane
 Humber Bay
 Humber Heights-Westmount
 Humber Valley Village
 Humberwood

 Islington-City Centre West
 Kingsview Village (The Westway)
 The Kingsway
 Long Branch
 Markland Wood
 Mimico
 New Toronto
 Princess Gardens
 Rexdale

 Richview
 Smithfield
 Stonegate-Queensway
 Sunnylea
 Thistletown
 Thorncrest Village
 West Humber-Clairville
 West Deane Park
 Willowridge

North York

The former city of North York is located north of York, Old Toronto, and East York, from the Humber River to the west and Victoria Park Avenue to the east. North York is split by Yonge Street into an east section and a west section. Several of North York's neighbourhoods (such as Lansing, Newtonboork and Willowdale) developed from postal villages when North York Township was primarily agrarian. Others are residential subdivisions developed after World War II. North York City Centre is a commercial district developed to be the 'downtown' of the city.

 Amesbury
 Armour Heights
 Bathurst Manor
 Bayview Village
 Bayview Woods-Steeles
 Bermondsey
 Black Creek
 The Bridle Path
 Clanton Park (Wilson Heights)
 Don Mills
 Don Valley Village (The Peanut)
 Downsview
 Flemingdon Park

 Glen Park (Yorkdale – Glen Park; Englemount; Marlee Village)
 Henry Farm
 Hillcrest Village
 Hoggs Hollow
 Humber Summit
 Humbermede (Emery)
 Jane and Finch (University Heights; Elia)
 Lansing
 Lawrence Heights
 Lawrence Manor
 Ledbury Park
 Maple Leaf
 Newtonbrook

 North York City Centre
 Parkway Forest
 Parkwoods
 Pelmo Park-Humberlea
 Pleasant View
 Uptown Toronto
 Victoria Village
 Westminster–Branson
 Willowdale
 York Mills
 York University Heights (Village at York)

Scarborough

The district of Scarborough extends from the east side of Victoria Park Avenue to the eastern border of Toronto. West Rouge was transferred from Pickering to Scarborough in 1974 as part of the establishment of Durham Region. It is the largest district by area.

Many of the neighbourhoods, such as Agincourt, Brown's Corners and Milliken, correspond to former postal villages supporting the then-agrarian township. Others are residential subdivisions developed after World War II. Others are commercial districts.

 Agincourt
 Armadale
 Bendale (Cedarbrae)
 Birch Cliff
 Brown's Corners (historical)
 Clairlea
 Cliffside
 Cliffcrest
 Dorset Park
 Eglinton East

 Golden Mile
 Guildwood
 Highland Creek
 Ionview
 L'Amoreaux
 Malvern
 Maryvale
 Milliken (also in Markham)
 Morningside
 Morningside Heights
 Oakridge

 Port Union (Centennial Scarborough)
 Rouge
 Scarborough City Centre
 Scarborough Junction
 Scarborough Village
 Steeles
 Tam O'Shanter-Sullivan
 West Hill
 West Rouge
 Wexford
 Woburn

York

The former city of York is situated between Old Toronto and North York, west of Bathurst Street (aside from the neighbourhood of Tichester at the southeasternmost corner of the former city, which extends as far east as Walmer Road and includes much of St. Clair West station). The community of Weston, to the northwest, was itself an independent village. Several neighbourhoods are former residential subdivisions built on the border with Toronto before and after World War II.

York is often considered to be of two sections: a western section and an eastern section, on either side of GO Transit's Barrie rail line.

 Briar Hill–Belgravia
 Fairbank (Caledonia–Fairbank)
 Humewood–Cedarvale (includes Upper Village (also part of Forest Hill))
 Lambton–Baby Point

 Little Jamaica (Eglinton West)
 Mount Dennis
 Oakwood Village (includes Five Points and Northcliffe; formerly known as Oakwood–Vaughan)
 Old Mill

 Rockcliffe–Smythe
 Silverthorn (Keelesdale)
 Tichester
 Weston

History

Multiple listing service districts and neighbourhoods
After the update of Toronto Multiple listing service (MLS) on July 5, 2011, the Toronto Real Estate Board (TREB) introduced a new search feature for the Toronto MLS, used by real estate agents operating in the region. MLS searches can be refined at three levels and MLS users can search houses by area, then by municipality, and then by neighbourhood or community. As with the other MLS services for other jurisdictions, it used Microsoft's Bing Maps for its web mapping features until 2018, when it switched to Google Maps. These feature changes were the first change of this magnitude in about 50 years of Toronto MLS history since its establishment.

The change was designed to eliminate the obsolete coding systems whereby Greater Toronto was divided into 86 artificial districts denominated by alphanumeric codes. Due to the growing population in the city and the increasing difficulty of browsing the code-based system, the TREB made a radical change, which is intended to simplify the use of MLS for real estate agents and home buyers.

Because Toronto is a populous municipality of its own, the core city area will continue to be split into coded districts, although each of the districts will in turn contain neighbourhoods. Hence, the city will be easily searchable as well.

The following table contains a complete list of Toronto districts with a possibly incomplete list of Toronto neighbourhoods within each district:

Business improvement areas
There are also several dozen city designated business improvement areas, covering almost all of Toronto's commercial areas. Some of these serve a particular ethnic group or several similar ethnic groups as part of an ethnic enclave.

Albion Islington Square
The Beaches
Bloor Annex
Bloor by the Park
Bloor West Village
Bloor Yorkville
Bloorcourt Village
Bloordale Village
Chinatown
Church and Wellesley
College Promenade
College West
Corso Italia
Danforth Mosaic
Danforth Village
The Danforth
Dovercourt Village
Downtown Yonge
Dundas Bathurst
Dundas West
Eglinton Hill
Eglinton Way
Emery Village
Fairbank Village
Forest Hill Village
Gerrard India Bazaar
Greektown on the Danforth
Harbord Street
Hillcrest Village
Historic Queen Street
The Junction
Kennedy Road
Kingsway
Knob Hill Plaza
Koreatown
Lakeshore Village
Liberty Village
Little Italy
Little Portugal
Long Branch Village
Mimico by the Lake
Mimico Village
Mirvish Village
Mount Dennis
Oakwood Village
Old Cabbagetown
Pape Village
Parkdale Village
Queen's Quay Harbourfront
Regal Heights Village
Riverside District
Roncesvalles Village
Rosedale Main Street
Sheppard East Village
St. Clair Gardens
St. Lawrence Market Neighbourhood
Toronto Entertainment District
Upper Village
Uptown Yonge
Village of Islington
West Queen West
Weston Village
Wexford Heights
Wychwood Heights
Yonge Lawrence Village
Yonge + St. Clair
York Eglinton

Lists of city-designated neighbourhoods

For administrative purposes, the City of Toronto divides the city into 140 neighbourhoods. These divisions are used for internal planning purposes. The boundaries and names often do not conform to the usage of the general population or designated business improvement areas. A number of neighbourhood maps of Toronto do exist, some produced by real estate firms and some by Internet portals. A project to map the neighbourhoods according to the common usage of the residents was done by the Toronto Star newspaper. Based on feedback from Star readers, it has produced the most comprehensive, albeit informal, neighbourhood map.

Table

See also

Demographics of Toronto neighbourhoods
List of people from Toronto
List of postal codes of Canada: M (Toronto postal codes begin with the letter M)

References

External links

 City of Toronto Neighbourhood Profiles
 Toronto Star Neighbourhood map
 Toronto Neighbourhood Guide
 Blog TO Neighbourhood map - focusing on restaurant and shopping districts

 
Toronto
neighbourhoods